The 1935 Swedish Ice Hockey Championship was the 14th season of the Swedish Ice Hockey Championship, the national championship of Sweden. AIK won the championship.

Tournament

First round 
 Tranebergs IF - UoIF Matteuspojkarna 1:0
 IK Göta - BK Nordia 9:0
 Nacka SK - IF Johanniterpojkarna 2:0
 Södertälje SK - IFK Mariefred 1:0
 IK Hermes - Södertälje IF 8:1

Quarterfinals 
 Hammarby IF - Nacka SK 10:0
 Karlbergs BK - IK Göta 3:1
 AIK - IK Hermes 1:0
 Tranebergs IF - Södertälje SK 1:0

Semifinals
 Hammarby IF - Karlbergs BK 8:0
 AIK - Tranebergs IF 6:0

Final
  Hammarby IF - AIK 1:2 n.V.

External links
 Season on hockeyarchives.info

Cham
Swedish Ice Hockey Championship seasons